Punctulum minutum is a species of minute sea snail, a marine gastropod mollusk or micromollusk in the family Rissoidae.

Description
The shell grows to a length of 2 mm.

Distribution
This species occurs in Arctic waters off the White Sea and the Okhotsk Sea.

References

 Gofas, S.; Le Renard, J.; Bouchet, P. (2001). Mollusca, in: Costello, M.J. et al. (Ed.) (2001). European register of marine species: a check-list of the marine species in Europe and a bibliography of guides to their identification. Collection Patrimoines Naturels, 50: pp. 180–213

Rissoidae
Gastropods described in 1987